Lucas Eduardo dos Santos João (born 4 September 1993), known as Lucas João, is a professional footballer who plays as a forward for EFL Championship club Reading and the Angola national team.

After starting out at Nacional, he went on to spend the vast majority of his career in the English Championship, with Sheffield Wednesday, Blackburn Rovers and Reading.

Lucas João made his full debut for Portugal in 2015, before changing his allegiance to Angola in 2022.

Club career

Nacional
Born in Lisbon of Angolan descent, Lucas João started playing football with amateurs Beira Mar Atlético Clube Almada. In 2011 he signed with C.D. Nacional, where he spent his last year as a junior.

Lucas João made his senior debut with lowly SC Mirandela, on loan. He returned to the Madeirans for the 2013–14 season, making his Primeira Liga debut on 15 September 2013 against F.C. Arouca after coming on as a 78th-minute substitute, in a 0–1 home loss.

Lucas João scored his first goal(s) in the top flight on 11 January 2015, his brace helping defeat Boavista F.C. 2–1 at home. He netted a further six – seven overall – during the campaign, as his team finished in seventh position.

Sheffield Wednesday
On 31 July 2015, Lucas João joined former teammate Marco Matias at English club Sheffield Wednesday, agreeing to a four-year contract for an undisclosed fee. He made his debut in the Football League Championship on 8 August, replacing Atdhe Nuhiu for the last 13 minutes of a 2–0 win against Bristol City. He scored his first goal three days later, in a 4–1 victory over Mansfield Town in the League Cup, also at Hillsborough.

Lucas João was one of three players on target on 27 October 2015 as Wednesday defeated Arsenal 3–0 at home to reach the fifth round of the League Cup. On 30 January 2017, he moved to fellow league team Blackburn Rovers on loan until the end of the season.

Reading
On 6 August 2019, Lucas João joined Reading on a four-year deal for an undisclosed fee three days after scoring against them at the service of Sheffield Wednesday. The first goal for his new club came on his second Championship appearance, but in a 2–1 away loss to Hull City.

On 5 September 2020, Lucas João scored a hat-trick in a 3–1 win against Colchester United in the EFL Cup. He ended the league season as the fifth highest goalscorer with 19, as the Royals missed the playoffs by one place.

International career

Portugal
Lucas João won five caps for Portugal at youth level, including three for the under-21s. He was first called up to the full side on 6 November 2015, with manager Fernando Santos picking him ahead of friendlies against Russia and Luxembourg. He made his debut in the former match, featuring 18 minutes in the 1–0 loss in Krasnodar.

Angola
In March 2022, Lucas João was selected by Angola for friendlies with Guinea Bissau and Equatorial Guinea to be held later that month.

Career statistics

Club

International

Honours
Individual
EFL Championship Player of the Month: February 2022

References

External links

1993 births
Living people
Portuguese sportspeople of Angolan descent
Portuguese footballers
Angolan footballers
Footballers from Lisbon
Association football forwards
Primeira Liga players
Segunda Divisão players
C.D. Nacional players
SC Mirandela players
English Football League players
Sheffield Wednesday F.C. players
Blackburn Rovers F.C. players
Reading F.C. players
Portugal youth international footballers
Portugal under-21 international footballers
Portugal international footballers
Angola international footballers
Dual internationalists (football)
Portuguese expatriate footballers
Angolan expatriate footballers
Expatriate footballers in England
Portuguese expatriate sportspeople in England